Sofla (also Romanized as Soflá; also known as Seyfollāh and Sufla) is a village in Sofla Rural District, in the Central District of Kharameh County, Fars Province, Iran. At the 2006 census, its population was 1,089, in 241 families.

References 

Populated places in Kharameh County